The 18th AARP Movies for Grownups Awards, presented by AARP the Magazine, honored films and television shows released in 2018 and were announced on February 4, 2019. The awards recognized films created by and about people over the age of 50. The ceremony was hosted by actor and comedian Martin Short, and was broadcast on PBS on February 15, 2019 as part of its Great Performances series.

Awards

Winners and Nominees

Winners are listed first, highlighted in boldface, and indicated with a double dagger.

Career Achievement Award
 Shirley MacLaine: "Few have done more for grownup filmmaking than MacLaine, who's averaged one new film or show every six months since turning 80."

Films with multiple nominations and awards

References 

AARP Movies for Grownups Awards
AARP
AARP